Golden Jubilee National Service of Thanksgiving may refer to:

 The service of thanksgiving held at St Paul's Cathedral to mark the Golden Jubilee of George III in 1809
 The service of thanksgiving held at Westminster Abbey to mark the Golden Jubilee of Queen Victoria in 1887
 The service of thanksgiving held at St Paul's Cathedral to mark the Golden Jubilee of Elizabeth II in 2002